The Melina Merkouri Cultural Centre is a municipal cultural organization in Athens, Greece. It is housed in an impressive old hat factory in Thisseio. The Centre has two permanent exhibitions, the one called "Travelogue of Athens", which presents  the neighborhoods of Athens at the beginning of the 20th century, and the other "The Charidimos Shadow Theater", with figures and materials of the famous shadow theater artist. The centre also includes the "Melina" hall, a  room where temporary exhibitions, events and concerts, but also seminars and meetings take place.

External links
www.athensinfoguide.com
www.athens-greece.us
Culture dept, City of Athens (in Greek)

Art museums and galleries in Greece
Museums in Athens